Shulin (Macedonian/Bulgarian: Шулин), formerly known officially as Diellas, is a village southeast of Lake Prespa in the Pustec Municipality which is officially recognised as a Macedonian minority zone located in the Korçë County, Albania.  The village is composed of ethnic Macedonians, which form part of the larger Macedonian minority in Albania. According to Bulgarian sources, including research by a Bulgarian scientist from Albania, the local inhabitants are Bulgarians.

History

In 1939, on behalf of 37 Bulgarian houses in Shulin Goge Lambrov signed a request by the local Bulgarians to the Bulgarian tsaritsa Giovanna requesting her intervention for the protection of the Bulgarian people in Albania - at that time an Italian protectorate.

Demographics
In 1900, Vasil Kanchov gathered and compiled statistics on demographics in the area and reported that the village of Chegan was inhabited by about 270 Bulgarian Christians.

According to a survey by Georgi Trajčev in 1911 and 1912, Shulin had 23 houses and 375 Bulgarian residents.

A 2007 estimate put the village population in the range of 600 to 650 people.

In 2013, the village's official name was changed back from "Diellas" to "Shulin", the Macedonian name.

Dialect 
Although Shulin is located in modern-day Korçë County, the village traditionally belongs to the Lower Prespa region, and therefore its inhabitants speak the Lower Prespa dialect rather than the neighbouring Korča dialect of Macedonian.

People from Shulin
Takjo Grozdani, Macedonian Party member

References

Populated places in Pustec Municipality
Villages in Korçë County
Macedonian communities in Albania